Eleutherine bulbosa is an herbaceous, perennial flowering plant species in the family Iridaceae. Among Spanish-speakers, the plant is known as lagrimas de la virgen ("tears of the virgin").

Like other Eleutherine species, E. bulbosa has a bulbous rootstock; a large subapical cauline leaf; and small, white, stellate, evening-blooming flowers. E. bulbosa grows in southern Mexico and in the Amazon rainforest, within the borders of Peru, Bolivia, Ecuador, Guyana, Suriname, and French Guiana, in addition to the Brazilian states of Amapá and Acre. It is widely cultivated for its medicinal properties.

Like E. latifolia, E. bulbosa has a basic chromosome number of x=6 (2n=12); it also has a similar bimodal karyotype, which is distinctive to this plant tribe (Tigridieae); all other genera of the tribe have x=7. Usually, E. bulbosa has a heteromorphic long chromosome pair, the result of a pericentric inversion in one of the long chromosomes, which makes it sexually sterile.

Rahenna described a subspecies in 1965: E. bulbosa subsp. citriodora.

References

External links

Eleutherine bulbosa (Mill.) Urb at the Catalogue of Life. Retrieved 25 June 2013.
Eleutherine bulbosa (Mill.) Urb at the National Center for Biotechnology Information. Retrieved 25 June 2013.

Iridaceae
Flora of the Amazon
Flora of Bolivia
Flora of Brazil
Flora of Ecuador
Flora of French Guiana
Flora of Guyana
Flora of Mexico
Flora of Peru
Flora of Suriname
Medicinal plants of South America
Plants described in 1918